Jack London, also known as The Story of Jack London, is a 1943 American biographical film made by Samuel Bronston Productions and distributed by United Artists. It was directed by Alfred Santell and produced by Samuel Bronston with  Joseph H. Nadel as associate producer, from a screenplay by Isaac Don Levine and Ernest Pascal based on the 1921 book The Book of Jack London by London's second wife, Charmian London.

The film starred Michael O'Shea as Jack London and Susan Hayward with Osa Massen, Harry Davenport, Frank Craven and Virginia Mayo.

Plot

The film follows scenes from the life of the writer-adventurer Jack London (Michael O'Shea, who somewhat resembled London) who was, among other things, oyster pirate, hobo, sailor, prospector and war correspondent. The film begins and ends with footage from 1943 of the launch of the liberty ship Jack London. In Oakland in 1890, after an accident involving a female colleague at the factory where he works, the young London quits and borrows money to buy a boat in which to illegally harvest oysters. The boat is soon impounded by police, one of his partners killed, and he is left without means. London signs on as an able seaman on a five-month trip to the Bering Sea, during which he begins to write. A brief stay at university proves frustrating as his stories are dismissed as "raw" despite London's defence of them as observed occurrences. He moves to the Yukon where he writes a story about a bar singer. Snowed in for months he writes Call of the Wild, which he sells to a publisher, who compares him to Rudyard Kipling, one of London's idols. The publisher introduces him to Charmian Kittredge (Susan Hayward). By the turn of the century London's career has taken off. He is asked by a newspaper to cover the Boer War, but on arrival at Plymouth, the war has already ended. London returns to Charmian.

Despite a promise not to leave Charmian again, London is given another foreign correspondent assignment, this time to Japan, where he is told of the start of the Russo-Japanese War. In Korea, an army captain reveals the Japanese aim to sack Manchuria and then Mongolia for raw materials as part of a long-term plan to conquer China, and then dominate the US and England. London's coverage of the taking of the Yalu River proves a scoop. However, he is arrested on charges of spying for Russia, and in a brutal prison witnesses the murder of his fellow inmates by the Japanese, who are portrayed as barbaric. Eventually, London is freed after the intervention of the White House. Back in the US, London attempts but fails to sell articles attesting to his view that there is a coming threat from Japan.

Cast
 Michael O'Shea as Jack London
 Susan Hayward as Charmian Kittredge
 Osa Massen as Freda Maloof
 Harry Davenport as Prof. Hilliard
 Frank Craven as Old Tom
 Virginia Mayo as Marnie
 Ralph Morgan as George Brett
 Jonathan Hale as Kerwin Maxwell
 Louise Beavers as Maurray Jeremy
 Leonard Strong as Captain Tanaka 
 Regis Toomey as Scratch Nelson
 Paul Hurst as 'Lucky Luke' Lannigan
 Lumsden Hare as English Correspondent
 Hobart Cavanaugh as Mike, Saloonkeeper
 Conway Morgan as Richard Harding Davos
 Robert Homans as Captain Allen 
 Wallis Clark as Theodore Roosevelt (uncredited)
 Pierre Watkin as American Consul (uncredited)

References

External links
 
 
 
 

1943 films
1940s biographical films
1940s historical adventure films
American biographical films
American historical adventure films
American independent films
1940s English-language films
Samuel Bronston Productions films
American black-and-white films
United Artists films
Jack London
Films directed by Alfred Santell
Films scored by Freddie Rich
Biographical films about writers
Films based on biographies
Films set in England
Films set in Japan
Films set in Korea
Films set in Yukon
Films set in the 1890s
Films set in the 1900s
Seafaring films
1940s independent films
Japan in non-Japanese culture
1940s American films